Özdemir Pasha (died 1561, Sana, Yemen Eyalet) was a Mamluk general for the Ottoman Empire, of Kumyk Turkic descent. He joined Hadım Süleyman Pasha's campaign to India in 1538 (see Ottoman naval expeditions in the Indian Ocean). Later he became the Ottoman governor of Yemen and invaded Abyssinia in 1557 for the Ottoman Empire, but failed and was captured in battle.

Özdemir Pasha was well-regarded for bringing some measure of stability in the otherwise difficult-to-govern Yemeni eyalet. Under his supervision, cities were garrisoned, fortresses were built and the trade routes were secured. His rule was cut short by his death in 1561 in Sana, Yemen.

His son, Özdemiroğlu Osman Pasha, became the grand vizier of the Ottoman Empire from 1584 to 1585.

References 

Year of birth missing
Military personnel of the Ottoman Empire
16th-century Ottoman military personnel
1561 deaths
Ottoman governors of Yemen